Arpinder Singh (born 30 December 1992) is an Indian triple jumper. He was a gold medallist at the 2018 Asian Games. He also claimed a bronze medal at the 2014 Commonwealth Games in Glasgow.

Career
In June 2014, Singh beat his previous best of 16.84 metres by jumping 17.17 metres at the 2014 National Inter-State Championships in Lucknow. In the process, he beat the national record previously held by Renjith Maheshwary and also secured a qualification for the 2014 Commonwealth Games where he won the bronze medal. The record was again broken by Maheshwary in 2016.

On August 29, 2018 which is celebrated as National Sports Day in India he won gold medal in triple jump event in 18th Asian games.

He covered the distance of 16.77 metres to bag the gold medal. He became the second Indian sportsperson to achieve this landmark. Before him Mohinder Singh Gill won gold medal in triple jump event in 1970 Bangkok Asian games event.

References

External links 
 

Living people
1992 births
Indian male triple jumpers
Athletes from Punjab, India
Athletes (track and field) at the 2014 Asian Games
Athletes (track and field) at the 2018 Asian Games
Commonwealth Games bronze medallists for India
Athletes (track and field) at the 2014 Commonwealth Games
Athletes (track and field) at the 2018 Commonwealth Games
Commonwealth Games medallists in athletics
Asian Games medalists in athletics (track and field)
Asian Games gold medalists for India
Medalists at the 2018 Asian Games
Recipients of the Arjuna Award
Asian Games gold medalists in athletics (track and field)
Medallists at the 2014 Commonwealth Games